Italy competed at the 2022 World Games held in Birmingham, United States from 7 to 17 July 2022. Athletes representing Italy won 13 gold medals, 24 silver medals and 12 bronze medals. The country finished in 4th place in the medal table.

Medalists

Invitational sports

Competitors
The following is the list of number of competitors in the Games.

Aerobic gymnastics

Italy won two medals in aerobic gymnastics.

Air sports

Italy competed in air sports and drone racing.

Archery

Italy won three medals in archery.

Artistic roller skating

Italy won three medals in artistic roller skating.

Boules sports

Italy won two medals in boules sports.

Bowling

Italy competed in bowling.

Canoe marathon

Italy competed in canoe marathon.

Canoe polo

Italy competed in canoe polo.

Cue sports

Italy competed in cue sports.

Dancesport

Italy won one silver medal in dancesport.

Finswimming

Italy competed in finswimming.

Fistball

Italy competed in fistball.

Flag football

Italy won one silver medal in flag football.

Inline hockey

Italy competed in the inline hockey tournament.

Ju-jitsu

Italy competed in ju-jitsu.

Karate

Italy won two medals in karate.

Men

Women

Kickboxing

Italy competed in kickboxing.

Lifesaving

Italy won 17 medals in lifesaving.

Muaythai

Italy won one gold medal in muaythai.

Parkour

Italy won one silver medal in parkour.

Powerlifting

Italy won two medals in powerlifting.

Rhythmic gymnastics

Italy won three medals in rhythmic gymnastics.

Road speed skating

Italy won three medals in road speed skating.

Softball

Italy finished in 7th place in the softball tournament.

Track speed skating

Italy won five medals in track speed skating.

Tug of war

Italy competed in tug of war.

Water skiing

Italy won two medals in water skiing / wakeboarding.

Wushu

Italy won one silver medal in wushu.

References

Nations at the 2022 World Games
2022
World Games